The Department of Regional Australia, Regional Development and Local Government was an Australian Government department that existed between September 2010 and December 2011.

Functions
In an Administrative Arrangements Order made on 14 September 2010, the functions of the department were broadly classified into the following matters:

Administration of the Jervis Bay Territory, the Territory of Cocos (Keeling) Islands, the Territory of Christmas Island, the Coral Sea Islands Territory, the Territory of Ashmore and Cartier Islands, and of Commonwealth responsibilities on Norfolk Island 
Constitutional development of the Northern Territory 
Constitutional development of the Australian Capital Territory 
Delivery of regional and rural specific services 
Planning and land management in the Australian Capital Territory 
Regional development 
Matters relating to local government 
Regional Australia policy and co-ordination 
Support for ministers and parliamentary secretaries with regional responsibilities

Intended outcomes
The department worked to help the Government of the day achieve its policy objectives by contributing to, and reporting against two key outcomes. The 2010–11 departmental annual report (which was the only annual report released by the department during its short period of operation) identified the outcomes as:
 Coordinated community infrastructure in rural, regional and local government areas through financial assistance.
 Good governance in the Australian territories through the maintenance and improvement of the overarching legislative framework for self-governing territories and laws and services for non self-governing territories.

Structure
During its life, the Department of Regional Australia, Regional Development and Local Government was accountable to Simon Crean as the Minister for Regional Australia, Regional Development and Local Government.

The department was staffed by Australian Public Service officials and headed by a Secretary, Glenys Beauchamp.  The department's staff numbered approximately 330.

Notes

References and further reading

Government agencies disestablished in 2011
2010 establishments in Australia
2011 disestablishments in Australia
Ministries established in 2010
Regional Australia, Regional Development and Local Government